Dr Ved Prakash Kamboj,  FNASc., FNA (born 1937) is the president of the National Science Academy of India (NASc; 2005–2006) and ex-director, CDRI and CSIR Emeritus Scientist, Central Drug Research Institute (CDRI).

Background and education
Ved Prakash was born in a Punjabi family of Lamba Pind village, Jullundur, in the Punjab Province of British India, on 1 April 1937. He received his basic education from Jullundur city. He obtained his  B.Sc (Honours) in 1959, M.Sc. (Honours) in 1960, Ph.D. in 1965 and D.Sc. in 1970, all from Punjab University, Chandigarh.  He took advanced training in Reproductive Biology and Contraceptive Technology in 1975 in West Germany, his field of specialisation being Reproductive Biology, Fertility Regulation and Endocrinology.

Scientific career
After graduation in 1960, Kamboj joined the Division of Endocrinology, Central Drug Research Institute (CDRI), Lucknow, Uttar Pradesh, India, in 1961 as a research scientist where he later became the Head of the Department of Endocrinology, which position he held until 1981.  In 1981, Kamboj was appointed the Deputy Director, Division of  Endocrinology of the Central Drug Research Institute  which position he held till 1992. In 1992, he took over as Director, Central Drug Research Institute, Lucknow and continued till 1997.  From 2005 till 2006, he was the President of the National Academy of Sciences, India (NASI).

Other assignments
Kamboj has been the  Chairman  of Review Committee on Genetic Manupulation (RCGM) 2007 and INSA Honorary Scientist 2006. He was also the Chairman of Biotech Consortium India Limited  (BCIL) Proteomics for drug discovery 2003.

Fellowships and memberships
In 1989, Kamboj was elected a Fellow of the Indian National Science Academy (INSA). He has been  Administrative Member, Indian National Science Academy (INSA) Council in 1998, 1999, 2007 and 2008–2010  and Member, Indian National Science Academy (INSA) Sec. Committee,  1991-192, 2003–2005, and 2004–2006, and 2007.

Awards and honors
Kamboj has won many distinctions and awards including Ranbaxy Research award 1992 in Medical Sciences. On 12 January 2000, he was also awarded the Vigyan Gaurav Award the Council of Science & Technology (CST), a division of the Government of Uttar Pradesh, for his contributions to medicine.  Kamboj also holds honours like F.N.A.Sc. and F.N.A..

Research activities
Kamboj has authored or co-authored over 300 research papers and articles appearing in Indian and international journals. He has been instrumental in the development of a nonsteroidal once-a-week contraceptive pill, ormeloxifene. He is the editor/author of several books including Chemistry and Biology of Herbal Medicine which is the proceeding of the conference held in January 1997 at CDRI, Lucknow.

References

External links
Recent articles scholarly articles for Dr Kamboj V.P CDRI Director 1992-1997: 
The National Academy of Sciences, India - Benefactors: 
Welcome to Department of Science and Technology, Govt. of India: 
Indian Institute of Technology Bombay: 

1937 births
Living people
20th-century Indian educational theorists
Medical doctors from Punjab, India
Indian endocrinologists
Fellows of the Indian National Science Academy
Fellows of The National Academy of Sciences, India
20th-century Indian medical doctors